Maurice Peter Deery (born 7 January 1947) is a former Australian rules footballer who played with Richmond in the Victorian Football League (VFL).

Notes

External links 

		

Living people
1947 births
Australian rules footballers from Victoria (Australia)		
Richmond Football Club players